Cicynethus is a genus of spiders in the family Zodariidae. It was first described in 1910 by Simon. , it contains 7 species.

Species

Cicynethus comprises 7 species:
 C. acanthopus Simon, 1910 (type) — Namibia
 C. acer Jocqué & Henrard, 2018 — Mozambique, South Africa
 C. decoratus (Lawrence, 1952) — South Africa
 C. floriumfontis Jocqué, 1991 — South Africa
 C. mossambicus Jocqué & Henrard, 2018 — Mozambique
 C. peringueyi (Simon, 1893) — South Africa
 C. subtropicalis (Lawrence, 1952) — South Africa

References

Zodariidae
Araneomorphae genera
Spiders of Africa
Spiders of China